Mehboob Aapke Qadmon Main is a 2019 Pakistani supernatural TV series started airing on Hum TV from 18 October 2019. It is produced by Momina Duraid and Moomal Shunaid under their banner MD Productions and Moomal Productions. Zubab Rana, Sukaina Khan and Saad Qureshi played the leading roles in the serial.

Cast
 Sukaina Khan as Shazia
 Saad Qureshi as Arsim 
 Zubab Rana as Sunaina 
 Agha Mustafa Hassan as Sarim
 Shaheen Khan as Arsim's mother
 Kinza Malik as Sunaina's mother
 Agha Talal as Shehryar (dead)
 Shazia Gohar as Naheed (dead) 
 Sonia Nazir as Sonia
 Farhat Nazar
 Parize Fatima
 Zubair Akram
 Syed Qamar Raza Rizvi

Soundtrack

The OST is composed by Nabeel Ur Rehman on lyrics of Balaaj Shah. It is sung by Jabar Abbas.

References

2019 Pakistani television series debuts
Hum TV original programming
Urdu-language television shows